Kranitz is a surname. Notable people with the surname include:

László Kránitz (born 1973), Hungarian politician
Rick Kranitz (born 1958), American baseball coach
Simon Kranitz (born 1996), German footballer

See also
Krantz